Douglas Payne (born 14 November 1972) is the bassist and backing vocalist of the Scottish band Travis.

Career
Payne was born in the south side of Glasgow, and was educated at Woodfarm High School. He was also a member of the local 28th Glasgow (Giffnock) Scout Group in his youth. He went on to become a student at the Glasgow School of Art, where he met the band's singer, Fran Healy. They teamed up to form Glass Onion (named after a Beatles' song), later renaming themselves Travis. Originally Payne was not part of Glass Onion, which featured two other members, but when they left he was asked to play for the band. At the time of being asked, Payne had never touched a bass guitar in his life; for weeks he refused to do it, until finally he agreed.

Although he is better known for his bass guitar playing and backing vocals, Payne has written songs of his own. Tracks such as "The Score", "Know Nothing" and "Good for Nothing" were all penned by Payne and have featured as b-sides on the band's more recent singles. Payne also sings lead vocals on some b-sides, for example "A Little Bit of Soul", from the reverse of "Flowers in the Window", and on "The Distance" from Singles. He wrote the song "Colder" which features on The Boy With No Name and three of the songs from the sixth album Ode to J. Smith, including single Something Anything, which is the first Travis single not to be written by Fran Healy. Payne also appeared as a backing vocalist in the song "Tumble and Fall" on Feeder's album Pushing the Senses.

Personal life 
Payne married actress Kelly Macdonald in 2003. In November 2007, an announcement on the Travisonline message board said that Payne was to become a father for the first time, making him the last member of Travis to do so. Freddie Peter Payne, his son with Macdonald, was born on 9 March 2008. Their second son, Theodore William Payne, was born on 8 December 2012.  Payne and Macdonald announced their separation in 2017. Payne likes football and supports Rangers F.C..

Equipment 
 1970s Fender Jazz Bass Natural Sunburst
 1970s Fender Jazz Bass Natural White
 1970s Fender Jazz Bass Natural Black
 1956 Fender Precision Bass Sunburst

References

Travis (band) members
1972 births
Living people
Musicians from Glasgow
Scottish bass guitarists
Scottish songwriters
21st-century bass guitarists